Kenneth Andrew Mace (3 March 1921 – 1 April 1999) was an Australian rules footballer who played with Hawthorn and St Kilda in the Victorian Football League (VFL).

Notes

External links 

Ken Mace's playing statistics from The VFA Project

1921 births
1999 deaths
Australian rules footballers from Victoria (Australia)
Hawthorn Football Club players
St Kilda Football Club players
Camberwell Football Club players